Qasim Sultan Al Banna is an Emirati politician who has worked in several positions in the Dubai government, including Deputy Director, Acting Director, and Director General of the Municipality.

References 

Dubai Municipality Website about Qasim Sultan during his work (1985 - 2006)
 Brief Biography of H. E. Mr. Qasim Sultan, the Former Director General of Dubai Municipality
 Qasim Sultan
 Dubai Municipality
 qasimsultan.com

People from Dubai
Emirati businesspeople
Living people
Year of birth missing (living people)